PDF Expert is a PDF editing app for iPhone, iPad and Mac.

Overview
The app allows a user to read, annotate and edit PDFs, change text and images, fill in forms and sign contracts.

PDF Expert was initially launched for iOS in 2010 for the first iPad and is now supported on the iPad, iPhone, and Mac.

See also
 PDF
 List of PDF software

References

External links

2010 software
PDF software
IOS software
MacOS software